Russ Peterson was an American college basketball, football, and baseball coach. He served as a multi-sport coach at American International College and Boston University.

Early life
Peterson was a native of Springfield, Massachusetts, where he attended the High School of Commerce. He then continued on to Springfield College, where he played football and lacrosse. He graduated as a member of the class of 1928.

Coaching career
In 1933, American International College president Chester McGown hired Peterson as the school's first athletic director. Peterson established the American International basketball program in 1933, and its football, baseball, and soccer programs in 1934. On October 13, 1939, Peterson coached American International to perhaps its greatest victory, a 7–6 upset of heavy favorites Saint Anselm at Pynchon Park. Trailing 6–0 with 1:30 remaining, American International elected to punt, but the kicker dropped the wet ball, and was forced to run. A block gave him an opening and he ran 60 yards for a touchdown. Future American International coach Henry Butova kicked the extra point to seal the victory. Peterson served as both the head football and basketball coach at American International. From 1934 to 1940, his football teams compiled a 16–27–2 record. As the basketball coach from 1933 to 1941, he compiled a 45–59 record.

In 1941, he was hired by Boston University as the line coach for its football team and as the freshman coach for its basketball program. In 1943, Boston University also appointed Peterson as its head baseball coach. That year, he temporarily left the school to take a commission in the United States Navy as a physical education instructor during World War II. Peterson returned to Boston and served as the head coach of the basketball team from 1945 to 1948 and compiled a 36–18 record. In 1948, he was promoted to the position of freshman football coach. In August 1949, Peterson resigned from his posts at Boston in order to take an athletic director position in Arlington. In 1953, he took over as head football coach at Springfield Technical High School, where he remained until 1958, when he resigned in order to become athletic director for Springfield, Massachusetts public schools.

References

Year of birth missing
Year of death missing
American International Yellow Jackets athletic directors
American International Yellow Jackets football coaches
American International Yellow Jackets men's basketball coaches
Basketball coaches from Massachusetts
Boston University Terriers men's basketball coaches
Boston University Terriers football coaches
Boston University Terriers baseball coaches
Springfield Pride football players
Springfield Pride men's lacrosse players
High school football coaches in Massachusetts
United States Navy officers
United States Navy personnel of World War II
Sportspeople from Springfield, Massachusetts
Military personnel from Massachusetts